Killer in Red is a 2017 Italian short film directed by Paolo Sorrentino and starring Clive Owen.  It is based on an original story by J. Walter Thompson.  It is also an advertisement for Campari.

Cast
Clive Owen as Floyd
Caroline Tillette as Lady in Red
Tim Ahern as Mixologist
Linda Messerklinger as Brunette
Tom Ashley as Young Mixologist
Steve Osborne as Producer
Emily M. Bruhn as Blonde
Denise Capezza as Young Woman in Black

References

External links
 

2017 films
2017 short films
Italian short films
Films directed by Paolo Sorrentino
2010s English-language films